Andreas Borum (1799, Hamburg - 29 April 1853, Munich) was a German painter and lithographer who also worked in stone, and a collector.

Biography
Borum worked in Leipzig as a housepainter before receiving an education at the Academy of Fine Arts, Munich.

From 1829 to 1835 he led the "Hamburg Art Colony" in Munich, a group which included artists such as Jakob Gensler, Georg Haeselich, Marcus Haeselich, Franz Heesche, Victor Emil Janssen, Hermann Kauffmann, Johann Karl Koch, Joh. Ludwig Westermann, Wilhelm Friedrich Wulff and Wassermann.

Career

Kehr & Niessen
From 1835 to 1839 he was employed together with D. Leon, Eduard Gerhardt and Bonaventura Weiß (born 1812) at the "lithographic-artistic" institute of the Kehr brothers, sometimes called Kehr & Niessen, which was founded in Cologne by the lithographer Carl Kehr and his brother Johann Philipp Kehr (born 1800 in Bad Kreuznach).

Notable works
 um 1824: Lithographie: Trarbach mit der Ruine Gräfenburg an der Mosel nach einem Gemälde von Domenico Quaglio bei J. Lacroix
 1827: architektonische Verzierungen im Verlag von Hermann und Barth in München die 1830 an der Herausgabe Malerische Topographie des Königreichs Bayern. beteiligt waren.
 1828: das Coliseum nach einem Gemälde von Rottmann als 39,2 cm x 55 cm bei Joseph Lacroix gedruckte Lithographie und Jahresgabe des Kunstverein München
 1828: der Dom zu Mailand nach einem Gemälde von Migliara, (Lithographie)
 1828: Neuötting nach einem Gemälde von Domenico Quaglio, (Lithographie)
 1828: Ein Seestück nach einem Gemälde Van de Velde, (Lithographie)
 um 1829: Ueberlingen am Bodensee. Blick vom Westen zum Münster, umgeben von zahlreichen Fachwerkhäusern mit Wäscherinnen an einem Bach und Brunnen nach einem Gemälde von Domenico Quaglio bei Ebner in Augsburg
 1834: Gemeinsam mit A. Grandmayer zu: Das Nahe Thal: von dem Ursprung der Nahe bis zur Mündung in den Rhein; nach der Natur von J. C. Scheuren aufgenommen.
 um 1835: Die Ruine der Ebernburg bei Kreuznach .
 um 1839: Die Heimkehr der Hirten nach Boud und Boudewins
 um 1840: gemeinsam mit Albert Emil Kirchner: Die Ludwigsstrasse in München
 Der Klosterhof im Schnee after Carl Friedrich Lessing
 Niederländische Landschaft after Hobbe
 Der Rheingrafenstein von der Westseite nach Hobbe

Exhibitions
1839: Ausstellung von Produkten des Kunst- und Gewerbefleißes in Köln mit der “Die Heimkehr der Hirten”, Allgemeines Organ für Handel und Gewerbe und damit verwandte Gegenstände. Band 4. Wöchentliches Beiblatt zum Allgemeinen Organ, enthaltend die Verhandlungen und Mittheilungen des Gewerbe-Vereins zu Köln.

References

External links
 Biografische Angaben, accessed 20 December 2013

1799 births
1853 deaths
19th-century German painters
19th-century German male artists
German male painters
Artists from Hamburg